Parliamentary elections were held in Senegal on 24 May 1998. The result was a victory for the ruling Socialist Party, which won 93 of the 140 seats. Voter turnout was just 39.3%.

Results

References

Senegal
Elections in Senegal
1998 in Senegal